Darren Mougey (born April 7, 1985) is an American football executive who is the assistant general manager for the Denver Broncos of the National Football League (NFL). Mougey also was a former American football wide receiver. He was signed by the Atlanta Falcons as an undrafted free agent in 2009. He played college football at San Diego State.

Playing career

College

2005
Mougey was recruited by then-head coach Tom Craft as a quarterback out of Arizona, and was rated as a three stars prospect by Rivals.com. During the 2005 season, Mougey replaced starting quarterback Kevin O'Connell.

2007
The Aztecs wanted to utilize Mougey's superior size and athleticism, so they tried him out at wide receiver. At 6-foot-6 and boasting an impressive knack for catching footballs, he became a starter in his first game as a receiver. He played nine games in 2007, finishing third on the team with 32 catches for 368 yards and scoring two touchdowns. He missed three games due to injury.

2008
In his senior year in 2008, Mougey was matched with redshirt freshman quarterback Ryan Lindley, and Mougey was expected to be the main target of the young passer. Mougey missed two games, but still managed to improve his production to 34 receptions for 437 yards while scoring five times. He led the team in yards-per-catch average at 12.9 out of players with at least ten catches, and he had a 43-yard reception.

National Football League

Atlanta Falcons
Mougey went undrafted in the 2009 NFL Draft. He was signed on the following Monday by the Atlanta Falcons. He was released by the Falcons on August 9.

Arizona Cardinals
On March 23, 2010, Mougey signed with the Arizona Cardinals.

Executive career

Denver Broncos
In 2012, Mougey joined the Denver Broncos as a scouting intern. In 2013, he was hired by the Broncos as a personnel and scouting assistant.

In 2015, Mougey was promoted to area scout. In 2020, he was promoted to assistant director of college scouting.

In 2021, Mougey was retained and promoted to director of player personnel under general manager George Paton.

On February 3, 2022, Mougey was promoted to assistant general manager.

References

External links
Arizona Cardinals profile
San Diego State profile

1985 births
Living people
American football wide receivers
Atlanta Falcons players
Arizona Cardinals players
Denver Broncos executives
Denver Broncos scouts
Players of American football from Arizona
San Diego State Aztecs football players